Krystian is a Polish male given name that is a Polish form of the name Christian, which means "follower of Christ". The name may refer to:

Krystian Aranowski (born 1988), Polish rower
Krystian Bielik (born 1998), Polish footballer
Krystian Brzozowski (born 1982), Polish wrestler
Krystian Gotfryd Deybel (1725–1798), Polish general 
Krystian Długopolski (born 1980), Polish ski jumper 
Krystian Feciuch (born 1989), Polish footballer 
Krystian Klecha (born 1984), Polish motorcyclist
Krystian Legierski (born 1978), Polish politician 
Krystian Łuczak (born 1949), Polish politician
Krystian Lupa (born 1943), Polish theatre director
Krystian Martinek (born 1948), German actor
Krystian Ochman (born 1999), Polish singer-songwriter
Krystian Sikorski (born 1961), Polish ice hockey player
Krystian Trochowski (born 1985), German rugby player
Krystian Zalewski (born 1989), Polish athlete
Krystian Zimerman (born 1956), Polish pianist

References

See also
 

Polish masculine given names